The oriental pratincole (Glareola maldivarum), also known as the grasshopper-bird or swallow-plover, is a wader in the pratincole family, Glareolidae.

Etymology
The genus name is a diminutive of Latin glarea, "gravel", referring to a typical nesting habitat for pratincoles. The species name maldivarum refers to the type locality, the ocean near the Maldive Islands; the type specimen, caught alive at sea, survived for a month on flies.

Description
These birds have short legs, long pointed wings and long forked tails. They have short bills, which is an adaptation to aerial feeding. The back and head are brown, and the wings are brown with black flight feathers. The belly is white. The underwings are chestnut. Very good views are needed to distinguish this species from other pratincoles, such as the very similar collared pratincole, which also has a chestnut underwing, and black-winged pratincole which shares the black upperwing flight feathers and lack of a white trailing edge to the wing. These features are not always readily seen in the field, especially as the chestnut underwing appears black unless excellent views are obtained.

Habits
An unusual feature of all pratincoles is that although classed as waders they typically hunt their insect prey on the wing like swallows, although they can also feed on the ground. The oriental praticole is a bird of open country, and they are often seen near water in the evening, hawking for insects.

Nesting
Their 2–3 eggs are laid on the ground.

Distribution
The Oriental pratincole is native to the warmer parts of South and Southeast Asia, breeding from North Pakistan and the Kashmir region across into China and south west. It is migratory and winters in both India and Pakistan, Indonesia and Australasia.

Vagrancy
They are rare north or west of the breeding range, but, amazingly, this species has occurred as far away as Great Britain more than once. The first record for the Western Palearctic was in Suffolk, England in June 1981. On 7 February 2004, 2.5 million oriental pratincoles were recorded on Eighty Mile Beach in Australia's north-west by the Australasian Wader Studies Group . There had previously been no records of this magnitude and it is supposed that weather conditions caused much of the world's population of this species to congregate in one area.

Gallery

References

External links

oriental pratincole
Birds of East Asia
oriental pratincole
Articles containing video clips
Taxa named by Johann Reinhold Forster